The Gran Premio Latinoamericano, formerly known as the Gran Premio Asociación Latinoamericana de Jockey Clubes e Hipódromos and currently also known as the Longines Gran Premio Latinoamericano due to sponsorship reasons, is a Group 1 horse race in Latin America alternatively run in Argentina, Brazil, Chile, Panama, Peru, and Uruguay. It is the richest and one of the most important races in Latin America.

The current member racecourses are the Argentinian Jockey Club (Hipódromo de San Isidro), Hipódromo Argentino de Palermo, Hipódromo La Plata, Jockey Club de São Paulo (Hipódromo Cidade Jardim), Jockey Club Brasileiro (Hipódromo da Gávea), Club Hípico de Santiago, Hipódromo Chile, Valparaiso Sporting Club, Hipódromo de las Américas, Hípica de Panamá (Hipódromo Presidente Remón), Jockey Club del Perú (Hipódromo de Monterrico), and HRU (Hipodromo Nacional de Maroñas).

History 
In 1980, the newly formed Latin American Association of Jockey Clubs and Racecourses, consisting of the Jockey Club de Buenos Aires, Jockey Club Brasileiro, Jockey Club de São Paulo, Club Hípico de Santiago, Hipódromo Chile, Jockey Club del Perú, Jockey Club de Montevideo, and Jockey Club de Venezuela, met and began planning an international race among them, rotating between the member racecourses, that eventually became the Gran Premio Latinoamericano. Mexico, Panama, and Puerto Rico later joined the Association, and in 2012 the Association was integrated into OSAF, the South American Organization for the Development of Thoroughbreds.

The Gran Premio Latinoamericano was first run in 1981 at Hipodromo Nacional de Maroñas. From 2000 to 2003, the race was not run due to a lack of money, but has been continuously run since 2004. The race has been sponsored by Longines since 2014. In 2016, the race was established as a race open to any horse originating from any country, and the first time that doping control was performed in a reference lab as recognized by the International Federation of Horseracing Authorities (IFHA).

The greatest number of entries to run in the race is 18, first in 1986 and again in 2020.

The 2006 running was the first time the race was simulcasted in North America, with Laurel Park serving as the hub.

In 2018, Chilean horses were not allowed to take part in the Gran Premio Latinoamericano due to a temporary ban on importing Chilean horses into the hosting country of Uruguay on account of a contagious disease outbreak at a Chilean training center.

Due to the COVID-19 pandemic, the 2020 edition of the race was in doubt and finally run behind closed doors as part of the last day of racing in Argentina for five months. The 2021 was initially set to run at Hipódromo de Monterrico, but was instead moved to Hipódromo de Maroñas and run in October instead of its usual March date, in front of a crowd of spectators limited to 3,500 fully vaccinated people.

In 2021, all three Uruguayan entries were owned, trained, and ridden by Brazilians, with the only Uruguayan professional involved being Héctor Fabián Lazo, jockey of the Chilean entry Win Here.

Locations 
Since its inauguration, the Gran Premio Latinoamericano has been run at eleven different tracks in six different countries.

Records
Speed records:

 2000 meters: 1:56.68 – Ya Primo (2019)
 2100 meters: 2:05.82 – Quick Casablanca (2012)
 2200 meters: 2:19.40 – Galeno (1987)
 2400 meters: 2:24.88 – Sixties Song (2017)

Most wins:
 2 – Much Better (1994, 1996)

Most wins by a jockey:
 5 – Jorge Ricardo (1991, 1994, 1996, 1998, 2007)
 3 – Edwin Talaverano (1993, 1999, 2015)
 2 – Carlos Trujillo (2008, 2011)
 2 – Jorge Valdivieso (1989, 2005)
 2 – Victor Bardales (1986, 1987)

Most wins by a trainer:
 3 – João Luiz Maciel (1991, 1994, 1996)
 2 – Jorge Salas Vera (2008, 2011)

Most wins by an owner:
 2 – Stud Myrna (2008, 2011)
 2 – Stud TNT (1994, 1996)

Most wins by a breeder:

 3 – Haras Río Santa (1986, 1999, 2004)
 3 – Haras Matancilla (1990, 2010, 2012)
 3 – Haras J. B. Barros (1994, 1996, 2009)

Wins by country:
 Brazil – 10 (1981, 1982, 1983, 1985, 1991, 1994, 1996, 1998, 2009, 2016)
 Chile – 10 (1984, 1988, 1990, 1995, 1997, 2010, 2012, 2013, 2019, 2022)
 Peru – 9 (1986, 1987, 1993, 1999, 2004, 2008, 2011, 2014, 2015)
 Argentina – 7 (1989, 1992, 2005, 2006, 2017, 2018, 2020)
 Uruguay – 2 (2007, 2021)

Winners

Notes

References

External links
 Winners of all the years

Horse races